The Insect Fear Film Festival is an annual event and hold every spring since 1984. It is hosted by the Entomology Graduate Students Association in the Department of Entomology at the University of Illinois at Urbana-Champaign. Although its slogan said: "scaring the general public with horrific films and horrific filmmaking," the purpose of this event is aimed to dispel fears of insects of the general public by providing relative insect knowledge.

Its format has generally consisted of two or three feature-length films alternating with animated or live-action shorts that illustrate various aspects of insect biology.  This event usually held conjunction with an insect petting zoo, a insect art contest and other activities.

The film festival's founder, entomology professor and department head May Berenbaum, conceived the idea as a graduate student at Cornell University, where it was deemed undignified. Berenbaum was able to execute the project after joining the University of Illinois faculty in 1980.

The festival is usually organized around themes. These have included insect invasions, as exemplified by The Naked Jungle and The Swarm, metamorphosis, cockroaches, mosquitos, and entomologists themselves. Every year, T-shirts with the year theme are designed and sold during events to support relative insect outreach event costs. The 39th IFFF was held online and, for the first time, tee shirts adorned with the 39th IFFF logo were also sale online.

The most popular offering at the festival, according to the National Wildlife Federation's magazine, has been Beginning of the End, which features giant grasshoppers invading the city of Chicago after consuming radiation-treated vegetables.

Media outlets covering the festival have included the Canadian Broadcasting Company, National Public Radio, the Washington Post, and The New York Times.

References

Film festivals in Illinois
Insects in popular culture
University of Illinois Urbana-Champaign
Fear
Film festivals established in 1984